Lakani Oala (born 13 September 1959) is a cricket umpire from Papua New Guinea. He is currently a member of ICC Associates and Affiliates Umpire Panel. Oala has stood in matches in the 2015–17 ICC World Cricket League Championship. In October 2016 he was selected as one of the eight umpires to stand in matches in the 2016 ICC World Cricket League Division Four tournament. He stood in his first One Day International (ODI) on 6 October 2017, in the match between Papua New Guinea and Scotland in the 2015–17 ICC World Cricket League Championship.

See also
 List of One Day International cricket umpires

References

External links
 Lakani Oala at ESPNcricinfo
 Lakani Oala at CricketArchive

1959 births
Living people
Papua New Guinean cricket umpires
Papua New Guinean One Day International cricket umpires
People from the National Capital District (Papua New Guinea)